is the first Japanese cover album by French-Canadian singer Himeka. The album was released on March 3, 2010, under her label Sony Music Japan International. The Limited edition contains a second CD with all the instrumental versions of the cover songs. All the songs are opening or endings from popular anime series. The cover album charted at the #137 spot on the weekly Oricon chart and sold 1,008 copies so far.

Track listing

References

2010 albums
Himeka albums